Washington High School is a fully accredited, public high school located in Kansas City, Kansas, United States. It serves students in grades 9 to 12 and operated by the Kansas City USD 500 school district.

History
On January 4, 1932 Washington High School (originally named Washington Rural High School) opened on Leavenworth Road in the northwest part of Wyandotte County, Kansas. The school was named after the first United States President George Washington. The new high school formed from the creation of Rural High School District #2 of Wyandotte County

Washington Rural High School’s attendance area abutted the west boundary of the Kansas City, Kansas School District. However, it was outside the city limits of Kansas City, Kansas.  The Washington attendance area population grew rapidly in the 1950s and 1960s for two reasons. First was the post-World War II baby boom era with middle-class families moving into the area.  The second reason was the commencement of white flight from Kansas City, Kansas.

In 1962, due to a new Kansas law that required the merger of elementary school districts and high school districts to provide “Unified” districts that offer kindergarten through grade 12, Washington High School District USD 201 was formed.  But by 1965, with rapid population growth and an urgent need for new schools, the new school district faced a financial crisis.  Due to the lack of a strong industrial/ commercial tax base and comparatively low residential property values, the district didn’t have the available tax base and corresponding tax revenues to fund its capital needs to expand.

The Washington District responded to its challenging situation by authorizing an election in 1966 to decide if USD 201 would be absorbed by Kansas City, Kansas School District USD 500.   That election measure narrowly passed which resulted in USD 500 annexing USD 201 in 1967.

The resulting expanded USD 500 district responded to the overcrowding at Washington High School by opening F. L. Schlagle High School three miles away at 59th Street and Parallel Parkway in 1972.

Sports and activities
Washington is a part of the Kansas State High School Activities Association 5A classification The school offers many sports and activities, including: Volleyball, Girls Basketball, Boys Basketball, Football, Wrestling, Baseball, Softball, Girls Soccer, Boys Soccer, Bowling, Track and Field, Cross Country, Scholars Bowl, Forensics, Debate, Robotics, and Choral Music.

Team State Championships
Washington High School has two team Kansas State High School State Championships which were in 5A-1A boys bowling in both 2010 and 2011.

Individual State Championship Records
 In 1974, Mark Hosking won the 5A-4A boys tennis state championship.
 In 1977, Rosa Kelly set the 5A girls 440 yard dash record (race has been discontinued) of 56.8.
 In 1978, both the Washington boys 2-Mile Relay team (8:04.0) and the Washington girls Mile Relay team (4:10.7) set Kansas 5A state championship meet records.
 In 1978, Paul Cowan won the 5A boys 330 intermediate hurdles (race has been discontinued) in a state record time of 39.5.
 In 1982, Washington High School athletes won both the boys (Brad Ogden) and girls (Mary Shaffer) 6A cross country championships.
 In 1991, Wendell Gaskin set both the 6A boys 400 meter dash record (46.76) and 200 meter dash record (21.29).
 In 2010, Le'Tristan Pledger set the 5A girls 100 meter high hurdles record of 13.90. In 2009, Pledger set the 5A girls long jump record of 19'10.75".
 In 2011, Cedric Phillips won the 5A-1A boys individual bowling state championship.

Notable alumni
Wendell Gaskin, former and USA Track and Field star 
Paul J. Morrison, former Kansas Attorney General
Le'Tristan Pledger, former Texas Tech University and USTFCCA All-American track and field star

Darrell Stuckey, former NFL player with San Diego Chargers and current Director of Football Relations at University of Kansas football
Earl Watson, former NBA player and head coach of Phoenix Suns and current assistant coach of Toronto Raptors
Nathan Louis Jackson, Screenwriter 
Freddie Williams II, American comic book writer and artist with DC comics on the comic series Robin and on the Eisner Award-winning series Seven Soldiers: Mister Miracle. He has since gone on to work on several crossover series including Batman/Teenage Mutant Ninja Turtles, Batman/Teenage Mutant Ninja Turtles II, He-Man/ThunderCats and Injustice vs. Masters of the Universe.

See also
 List of high schools in Kansas
 List of unified school districts in Kansas

Other high schools in Kansas City USD 500 school district
 J. C. Harmon High School in Kansas City
 F. L. Schlagle High School in Kansas City
 Wyandotte High School in Kansas City
 Sumner Academy of Arts and Science in Kansas City

References

External links
 
 

Educational institutions established in 1932
High schools in Kansas
Education in Kansas City, Kansas
Public high schools in Kansas
Buildings and structures in Kansas City, Kansas
Schools in Wyandotte County, Kansas
1932 establishments in Kansas